This is a list of events from British radio in 1954.

Events
25 January – First broadcast of Dylan Thomas's radio play Under Milk Wood, two months after its author's death, with Richard Burton as 'First Voice', on the BBC Third Programme.
18 September – The Last Night of the Proms for the first time features the subsequently almost-invariable coupling of Sir Henry Wood's 1905 Fantasia on British Sea Songs, Sir Edward Elgar's 1902 setting of "Land of Hope and Glory", Sir Hubert Parry's 1916 setting of William Blake's "Jerusalem", and "Rule, Britannia!".
BBC Light Programme Saturday morning music request programme Children's Favourites, presented by Derek McCulloch ("Uncle Mac"), replaces Children's Choice.

Programme debuts
2 November – Hancock's Half Hour on BBC radio (1954–1959 on radio)
Antony Hopkins Talking About Music on the BBC Third Programme (1954–1992)

Continuing radio programmes

1930s
 In Town Tonight (1933–1960)

1940s
 Music While You Work (1940–1967)
 Sunday Half Hour (1940–2018)
 Desert Island Discs (1942–Present)
 Family Favourites (1945–1980)
 Down Your Way (1946–1992)
 Have A Go (1946–1967)
 Housewives' Choice (1946–1967)
 Letter from America (1946–2004)
 Woman's Hour (1946–Present)
 Twenty Questions (1947–1976)
 Any Questions? (1948–Present)
 Mrs Dale's Diary (1948–1969)
 Take It from Here (1948–1960)
 Billy Cotton Band Show (1949–1968)
 A Book at Bedtime (1949–Present)
 Ray's a Laugh (1949–1960)

1950s
 The Archers (1950–Present)
 Educating Archie (1950–1960)
 Listen with Mother (1950–1982)
 The Goon Show (1951–1961)

Births
28 May – Andy Hamilton, comedy scriptwriter and performer
8 July – Mark Tavener, scriptwriter (d. 2007)
26 August – Steve Wright, DJ
27 August – Andrew Marshall, comedy scriptwriter
27 November – Arthur Smith, comedian and radio presenter
1 December – Alan Dedicoat, newsreader and broadcast announcer
David Miles, newsreader and broadcast announcer

See also 
 1954 in British music
 1954 in British television
 1954 in the United Kingdom
 List of British films of 1954

References 

 
Years in British radio
Radio